Mark Marleku (born 27 April 2000) is a Kosovan professional footballer who plays as a centre-forward for Kriens, on loan from Luzern.

Club career

Luzern
On 24 June 2020, Marleku made his debut as a professional footballer in a 2–0 away defeat against Lugano after coming on as a substitute at 86th minute in place of Silvan Sidler. On 18 September 2020, he signed his first professional contract with Swiss Super League side Luzern after agreeing to a three-year deal.

International career

Under-19
On 2 October 2018, Marleku was named as part of the Kosovo U19 squad for 2019 UEFA European Under-19 Championship qualifications. Eight days later, he made his debut with Kosovo U19 in 2019 UEFA European Under-19 Championship qualification match against Austria U19 after coming on as a substitute at 82nd minute in place of Bleart Tolaj.

Under-21
On 15 March 2021, Marleku received a call-up from Kosovo U21 for the friendly matches against Qatar U23, but was unable to join the squad due to COVID-related travel restrictions. On 8 June 2021, he made his debut with Kosovo U21 in 2023 UEFA European Under-21 Championship qualification match against Andorra U21 after coming on as a substitute at 67th minute in place of Rilind Nivokazi and scored his side's second goal during a 2–0 home win.

Career statistics

Club

References

External links

Mark Marleku at Swiss Football League

2000 births
Living people
Sportspeople from Lucerne
Association football forwards
Kosovan footballers
Kosovo youth international footballers
Kosovo under-21 international footballers
Kosovan expatriate footballers
Kosovan expatriate sportspeople in Switzerland
Swiss men's footballers
Swiss people of Kosovan descent
Swiss people of Albanian descent
Swiss Super League players
FC Luzern players
SC Kriens players